Ward-Meade Park Botanical Gardens 2.5 acres (10,000 m2) are botanical gardens located in Historic Ward-Meade Park at 124 NW Fillmore Street, Topeka, Kansas, United States.

The gardens feature more than 500 varieties of flowers, shrubs, and trees, all labeled with their botanical names, as well as a water garden with a footbridge, a gazebo and benches.

External links
Ward-Meade Park Review and photo tour.

See also 
 List of botanical gardens in the United States

Botanical gardens in Kansas
Protected areas of Shawnee County, Kansas
Tourist attractions in Topeka, Kansas